Walter Grubbe (1655–1715), of Eastwell House, Potterne, Wiltshire, was an English politician.

He was a Member (MP) of the Parliament of England for Devizes in 1685, 1689 and 1690.

References

1655 births
1715 deaths
People from Wiltshire
English MPs 1685–1687
English MPs 1689–1690
English MPs 1690–1695